Homonoea uniformis is a species of beetle in the family Cerambycidae. It was described by Karl Jordan in 1894. It is known from Sanghir, Indonesia and Borneo.

References

Homonoeini
Beetles described in 1894